Bob Manning (born June 1945) is a vocalist now living in Minnesota, United States. 

Bob began singing gospel music as a child in Virginia, U.S., and followed a stage career to New York City where he worked with among others: Gladys Knight, James Brown, Bo Diddley, Dick Clark, The Coasters and later The Four Tops. 

Living in Stockholm, Sweden from 1983 to 1998, Bob had a number of bands and worked with top-notch Swedish artists such as Ann-Christine Hedmark, Roger Pontare and Coste Apetrea; and was responsible for the first single recording of "Soul Sister" with Zemya Hamilton (Sonet Recording Studio). 

From 1991 to 1998, he worked mainly with The Soul Enterprise, and toured throughout Scandinavia, appearing at venues such as Fasching, Stampen, the Stockholm Jazz & Blues Festival, the Stockholm Water Festival, etc., and opened for or shared the stage with Soul giants such as Isaac Hayes, Al Green and Wilson Pickett.

Discography 
 Dance Beat, Shine On You, EMI Dancebeat Records, 1996
 Scrappy G, Mobbin Trow da City, MCA Music Entertainment, 1996
 André De Lange, A Friend, BIEM/NCB/GEMA, 1996
 Jazz On The Corner, Various Artists, Arietta Disks Musikprod. AB, 1995
 Chicago Express, Permanently Blue, Amigo Musik, 1995
 Totally Wired, Sweden, Soul Sister, Acid Jazz, 1994
 Blue Connection, Live at Clipper Club, Dragon Records Sweden, 1993
 All That Blues, From Sweden, Jefferson Rec, 1993
 En Blå Timme, That's Entertainment, TER Records 1993

References 
 https://web.archive.org/web/20070928212646/http://www.soulent.com/bobmanning.htm
 http://www.epitonic.com/index.jsp?refer=http%3A%2F%2Fwww.epitonic.com%2Fartists%2Fbobmanning.html
 https://web.archive.org/web/20070217233918/http://www.dancebeat.net/html/artists/manning.shtml

Living people
American soul singers
1945 births
Soul Enterprise members